Balnoi is a village and municipality in Poonch district of the Indian union territory of Jammu and Kashmir.

Demographics
According to the 2011 census of India, Balnoi has 435 households. The literacy rate of Balnoi was 51.03% compared to 67.16% of Jammu and Kashmir. In Balnoi, Male literacy stands at 63.74% while the female literacy rate was 39.47%.

Transportation

Road
Balnoi is well-connected by road to other places in Jammu and Kashmir and India by the NH 144A and other intra-district roads.

Rail

Air

See also
Jammu and Kashmir
Poonch district
Poonch
Chandimarh

References

Villages in Mendhar tehsil